The American Ireland Fund (DBA The Ireland Funds America), is a tax-exempt organization incorporated under the laws of the United States and has been determined by the IRS to be a public charity under section 501(c)(3) of the Internal Revenue Code, tax ID # is 25-1306992. The organization raises funds for the support of peace and reconciliation, community development, education, and arts and culture in Ireland.
Collectively with The Ireland Funds’ 12 worldwide chapters, it has raised more than $550 million (US), benefiting more than 3,000 Irish charities.

History
Founded by Tony O'Reilly and Dan Rooney, The Ireland Funds America is part of The Ireland Funds. The Ireland Funds were founded in 1976. On St. Patrick's Day of 1987, The Ireland Fund merged with the American Irish Foundation led by Arthur William Bourn Vincent. The American Irish Foundation had been founded by US President John F. Kennedy and Irish President Éamon de Valera. After the merger, the new organization took the name The American Ireland Fund. The merger was made official at a White House function.

Today, the global organization is known as The Ireland Funds. Operating in 12 countries with worldwide membership chapters, The Ireland Funds have raised more than $600 million (US) for over 3,200 organizations. The Irish Times reported that the organization gave $15.7 million to such Irish organizations in 2012. The organization's net revenue amounted to more than $20 million in both 2011 and 2012. According to the organisation's 2015 Form 990, total unrestricted revenues and support amounted to $29,893,941.

The American Ireland Fund donated between $500,000 and $1 million to the Clinton Foundation.

Headquarters
The headquarters of The Ireland Funds America is in Boston, Massachusetts.

References

External links
The Ireland Funds America

Ireland Funds
Non-profit organizations based in Massachusetts